"Dumb" is a song by American R&B recording artist Faith Evans, recorded for R&B Divas (2012), a compilation album led by Evans which featured the first season stars of the same-titled TV One reality series. It was written by Evans along with Chris "Brody" Brown, Toni Coleman, Achia Dixon, Larrance Dopson, Lamar Edwards, Camille Hooper, and Jaila Simms, incorporating a sample from the composition "Broadway Combination", penned by Christian Arlester for his band Dyke and the Blazers. Production on "Dumb" was handled by music production team 1500 or Nothin', featuring additional production by Evans.

The retro soul track was released as the compilation album's second single following Evans-led lead single "Tears of Joy". A music video for "Dumb" was photographed by Bishop Moore and features Evans singing and dancing in a 1970s-themed clip.

Music video
A music video for "Dumb" was Directed  by Bishop Moore. In the ’70s-themed clip, Evans jams with her band and sits atop a candy red Ford Mustang.

Credits and personnel
Credits adapted from the liner notes of R&B Divas.

Production – 1500 or Nothin'
Co–production, vocal production – Faith Evans
Additional vocals – Fizzy Gillespie & The Fayettes
Mixing – Tony Maserati
Mixing assistance – Christopher Tabron
Recording – Ben Briggs III
Mastering – Herb Powers

Charts

References

2012 singles
2012 songs
Faith Evans songs
Songs written by Faith Evans
American dance-pop songs
MNRK Music Group singles
Disco songs
Songs written by Christopher Brody Brown
Songs written by Larrance Dopson
Songs written by Lamar Edwards